Saidabad is a city in Hyderabad, India.

Saidabad or Saiyidabad may also refer to:

Afghanistan
Saydabad District, a district in Maidan Wardak Province, Afghanistan
Saydabad, the capital of Saydabad District, Maidan Wardak, Afghanistan

Iran
Saidabad Rural District (disambiguation), administrative subdivisions of Iran

Alborz Province

Saidabad, Alborz, a village in Alborz Province, Iran

Ardabil Province
Saidabad, Ardabil, a village in Namin County
Saidabad, Nir, a village in Nir County

Bushehr Province
Saidabad, Bushehr, a village in Bushehr Province, Iran

East Azerbaijan Province
Saidabad, Bostanabad, a village in Bostanabad County
Saidabad, Maragheh, a village in Maragheh County

Fars Province

Golestan Province
Saidabad, Golestan, a village in Torkaman County

Hamadan Province
Saiyidabad, alternate name of Seydabad, Hamadan, a village in Famenin County

Hormozgan Province
Saidabad, Hormozgan, a village in Bandar Abbas County

Isfahan Province
Saidabad, Golpayegan, a village in Golpayegan County
Saidabad, Lenjan, a village in Lenjan County
Saidabad, Shahin Shahr and Meymeh, a village in Shahin Shahr and Meymeh County

Kerman Province
Saidabad, former name of Sirjan, a city in Kerman Province, Iran
Saidabad, Anbarabad, a village in Anbarabad County
Saidabad-e Olya, Kerman, a village in Anbarabad County
Saidabad-e Sofla, Kerman, a village in Anbarabad County
Saidabad, Bam, a village in Bam County
Saidabad, Kahnuj, a village in Kahnuj County
Saidabad, Kerman, a village in Kerman County
Saidabad, Chatrud, a village in Kerman County
Saidabad, Derakhtengan, a village in Kerman County
Saidabad, Golbaf, a village in Kerman County
Saidabad, Razmavaran, a village in Rafsanjan County
Saidabad-e Shafipur, a village in Rafsanjan County
Saidabad, Rigan, a village in Rigan County
Saidabad, Rudbar-e Jonubi, a village in Rudbar-e Jonubi County

Kurdistan Province
Saidabad, Kurdistan, a village in Dehgolan County

Markazi Province
Saidabad, Markazi, a village in Markazi Province, Iran
Sayidabad, Markazi, a village in Markazi Province, Iran

Mazandaran Province
Saidabad, Sari, a village in Sari County
Saidabad, Chahardangeh, a village in Sari County
Saidabad, alternate name of Aqeh Kheyl, a village in Sari County

Qazvin Province
Saidabad, Avaj, a village in Qazvin Province, Iran
Saidabad, Dashtabi, a village in Qazvin Province, Iran
Saidabad, Takestan, a village in Qazvin Province, Iran

Qom Province
Saidabad, alternate name of Sadabad, Qom Province, Iran

Razavi Khorasan Province
Saidabad, Razavi Khorasan, a village in Mashhad County, Razavi Khorasan Province, Iran
Saiyidabad, alternate name of Seyyedabad, Chenaran, Razavi Khorasan Province, Iran
Saidabad, alternate name of Seyyedabad, Khoshab, Razavi Khorasan Province, Iran
Saidabad, alternate name of Sadabad, Fariman, Razavi Khorasan Province, Iran
Saiyidabad, alternate name of Sadabad, Rashtkhvar, Razavi Khorasan Province, Iran

Semnan Province
Saidabad, alternate name of Sadabad, Shahrud, Semnan Province, Iran

Sistan and Baluchestan Province
Saidabad, Bampur, a village in Bampur County
Saidabad, Hirmand, a village in Hirmand County

South Khorasan Province
Saidabad, South Khorasan, a village in Tabas County
Saiyidabad, alternate name of Seyyedabad, Fakhrud, South Khorasan Province, Iran
Saiyidabad, alternate name of Seyyedabad, Qohestan, South Khorasan Province, Iran
Saidabad, alternate name of Kalateh-ye Seyyed Ali, South Khorasan, Iran

Tehran Province
Saidabad, Shahriar, a village in Shahriar County
Saidabad-e Jajrud, a village in Pardis County
Saidabad Rural District (Pardis County)
Saidabad Rural District (Shahriar County)
Saidabad, Pishva, a village in Tehran Province, Iran
Saidabad, alternate name of Seyyedabad, Damavand, a village in Tehran Province, Iran
Saidabad, alternate name of Nematabad-e Ghar, Tehran Province, Iran

West Azerbaijan Province
Saidabad, Chaldoran, a village in Chaldoran County
Saidabad, Khoy, a village in Khoy County
Saidabad, Maku, a village in Maku County
Saidabad, Shahin Dezh, a village in Shahin Dezh County

Yazd Province
Saidabad, Yazd, a village in Taft County

Zanjan Province
Saidabad-e Olya, Zanjan, in Ijrud County
Saidabad-e Sofla, Zanjan, in Ijrud County
Saidabad Rural District (Zanjan Province), in Ijrud County
Saidabad, Zanjan, in Khodabandeh County

See also
Seyyedabad (disambiguation)